The National Institute for Agronomic Study of the Belgian Congo ( (INÉAC),  (NILCO) ) was a research facility established in Yangambi in the Belgian Congo, operating from 1933 to 1962.

INEAC was established as a successor to the Régie des Plantations de la Colonie (REPCO).
The goal of this institute was to follow a more scientific approach with regards to agricultural policies and innovations, and to promote the diffusion of agricultural innovations and know-how under the Congolese farmers. The creation of this institute was part of a larger 'indigenous peasantry programme'. This policy aimed to modernize indigenous agriculture by assigning plots of land to individual families (after rigorous prospection and soil analysis) and by providing them with government support in the form of selected seeds, agronomic advice, fertilizers, etc. The indigenous agricultural techniques were combined with new scientific discoveries, aimed at creating more efficient hybrid farming models and increasing the living standards in the traditional rural communities. In this way, the Institute for Agronomic Study of the Belgian Congo had a vast impact on the practical implementation of the social and economic agricultural policy of the colonial government.

Initial research and policies
In the 1930s researchers at INÉAC found the relationship between the tenera, dura and pisifera oil palms.
Oil palms have relatively low yield around Yangambi compared to coastal regions.
The scientific research undertaken by INÉAC played an essential role in improving the supply of rubber and palm oil in support of the war effort during World War II.

Post World War II
After the second World War the indigenous peasantry programme became widely spread all over the rural parts of the Belgian Congo, based on the (economic) success of the pilot projects in the mid thirties. The Institute for Agronomic Study of the Belgian Congo also played an important role in the implementation of the Ten year plan for the economic and social development of the Belgian Congo (1950–1959), of which the agrarian development of the colony was one of the cornerstones.

During this period, the institute studied a broad range of agricultural topics, gaining international reputation, with 32 research centers throughout the Belgian Congo and Rwanda-Urundi. By 1959, the scientific research department in Yangambi was made up of the divisions Climatology, Plant physiology, Agricultural engineering and mechanics, Zootechnics, Hydrobiology, Agricultural economics and a diverse range of research into specific crops.

Criticism

The indigenous peasantry programme was intended to increase the living conditions of the traditional rural communities, but critics state that the programme was mainly developed as a solution for the increasing soil depletion due to excessively intense cultivation and inadequate soil management. However, the paysannats programme was designed to be flexible and the implementation varied based on the geographic regions and districts. The institute has also been criticized for concentrating on large-scale agriculture mainly focused on the production of crops suited for export markets.

Two years after independence, on 31 December 1962, the National Institute for Agronomic Study of the Belgian Congo (INÉAC) changed its name into the Institut National des Etudes et Recherches Agronomique (INERA).

Other Research

The center developed a number of varieties of soybeans for use in different parts of the country. Early-maturing varieties yielded over 1,200 kg/ha of soybeans.
Field trials showed that inoculation could increase yields by 80% to 300%.
In the 1950s INÉAC researchers discovered the 'Yangambi km 5' (AAA) dessert banana. This variety yields large numbers of small fruit with an excellent taste, is productive even on poor soils and is resistant to black leaf streak disease.
There is some evidence that this cultivar may have originated in southern Thailand, introduced to the Kilo-Moto region in northeastern Congo and then brought to Yangambi before World War II.

Présidents-directeurs généraux 
1934-1934: Pierre Ryckmans (was appointed Governor-General of the Belgian Congo later that year)
1949–1962 : Floribert Jurion

References

Sources

Belgian Congo
Agriculture in the Democratic Republic of the Congo
Oil palm
Palm oil production in the Democratic Republic of the Congo